USS Sea Devil (SSN-664), a Sturgeon-class attack submarine, was the second ship of the United States Navy to be named for the sea devil (Manta birostria), also known as the manta ray or devil ray, the largest of all living rays, noted for power and endurance.

Construction and commissioning
The contract to build Sea Devil was awarded to Newport News Shipbuilding and Dry Dock Company in Newport News, Virginia. on 28 May 1964, and her keel was laid down there on 12 April 1966. She was launched on 5 October 1967, sponsored by Mrs. Ignatius J. Galantin, the wife of Admiral Ignatius J. "Pete" Galantin (1910-2004), and commissioned on 30 January 1969.

Service history
Sea Devil was assigned to Submarine Division 62 at Norfolk, Virginia. She operated out of Norfolk into at least 1977. She was assigned to Submarine Squadron 4 in Charleston SC from the mid-1980s until her decommissioning in 1991. She was a 637 class fast attack hunter killer. She also surfaced multiple times through the ice in the arctic.

Decommissioning and disposal
Sea Devil was decommissioned on 16 October 1991 and stricken from the Naval Vessel Register the same day. Her scrapping via the Nuclear-Powered Ship and Submarine Recycling Program at Puget Sound Naval Shipyard in Bremerton, Washington, began on 1 March 1998 and was completed on 7 September 1999.

References 

NavSource Online: Submarine Photo Archive Sea Devil (SSN-664)

Ships built in Newport News, Virginia
Sturgeon-class submarines
Cold War submarines of the United States
Nuclear submarines of the United States Navy
1967 ships